Visherogorsk is a rural locality (a settlement) and the administrative center of Visherogorskoye Rural Settlement, Krasnovishersky District, Perm Krai, Russia. The population was 440 as of 2010. There are 4 streets.

Geography 
Visherogorsk is located 19 km northeast of Krasnovishersk (the district's administrative centre) by road. Storozhevaya is the nearest rural locality.

References 

Rural localities in Krasnovishersky District